Stelis bucaramangae is a species of orchid plant native to Colombia.

References 

bucaramangae
Flora of Colombia